In the history of the Dominican Republic, the period of Era de Francia ( "Era of France", "French Era" or "French Period") occurred in 1795 when France acquired the Captaincy General of Santo Domingo, annexed it into Saint-Domingue and briefly came to acquire the whole island of Hispaniola by the way of the Treaty of Basel, allowing Spain to cede the eastern colony as a consequence of the French Revolutionary Wars.

During this time, it was also referred to as the French Santo Domingo.

Background
In 1665, French colonization of the western part of the  island was officially recognized by Louis XIV. The French colony was given the name Saint-Domingue. In the 1697 Treaty of Ryswick, Spain formally ceded the western third of the island to France. Saint-Domingue quickly came to overshadow the east in both wealth and population. Nicknamed the "Pearl of the Antilles," it became the richest colony in the West Indies and one of the richest in the world. Large sugar cane plantations were established and worked by hundreds of thousands of African slaves who were imported to the island. In 1754, the population numbered 14,000 whites, 4,000 free mulattoes and 172,000 negroes.

The Spanish colony on the other hand sank lower than ever. Practically abandoned by Spain, there was no commerce beyond a little contraband and only the most indispensable agriculture, the inhabitants devoting themselves almost entirely to cattle raising. The ports were the haunts of pirates, and a number of Dominicans also became privateers. The Dominican privateer Lorenzo Daniel became the scourge of the British, from whom he proceeded to plunder 70 merchant ships as well as warships.

The division of Hispaniola between France and Spain in 1697 recognized a reality with which neither the Kings nor their Revolutionary successors were happy. Although the population of Spanish Santo Domingo was perhaps one-fourth that of French Saint-Domingue, this did not prevent Charles IV of Spain from launching an invasion of the French side of the island in 1793, attempting to take advantage of the chaos sparked by the French Revolution (1789–99). Although the Spanish military effort went well on Hispaniola, it did not so in Europe. As a consequence, Spain was forced to cede Santo Domingo to the French under the terms of the Treaty of Basel (July 22, 1795) in order to get the French to withdraw from Spain.

News that the Spanish colony had been ceded to France reached Santo Domingo in October 1795. Those who could not reconcile themselves to the new situation had up to a year to remove themselves to Cuba, Puerto Rico, or Venezuela, where they were to be given facilities to make a fresh start. Between 1795 and 1810 some 125,000 persons are estimated to have left the Spanish sector of the island, leaving its population diminished by two-thirds compared with what it had been before the French Revolution.

French occupation 
At the time, slaves led by Toussaint Louverture in Saint-Domingue were in revolt against France. In 1801, Toussaint Louverture arrived in Santo Domingo, proclaiming the abolition of slavery on behalf of the French Republic and then captured Santo Domingo from the French, taking control of the entire island. In 1802 an army sent by Napoleon under the command of Charles Leclerc, captured Toussaint Louverture and sent him to France as prisoner. In the event, the Dominicans collaborated with Leclerc and his French troops in order to expel the Haitians. Toussaint's successors and yellow fever succeeded in expelling the French again from Saint-Domingue. The nation declared independence as Haiti in 1804. Even after the Haitians had defeated the French, a small French garrison remained in the former Spanish colony.

In 1805, after crowning himself Emperor, Jean-Jacques Dessalines invaded, reaching Santo Domingo before retreating in the face of a French naval squadron. The Haitians fell back through the settled area of the interior, sacking the towns of Monte Plata, Cotui and La Vega, and slaughtering the citizens of Moca and Santiago. They left the fields laid waste, the cities ablaze and the churches in ashes behind them. In Moca only two people survived, thanks to corpses having been piled up on those still living in the church where the principal massacre took place.

In October 1808 the rich landowner Juan Sánchez Ramírez, who had fled Santo Domingo during French rule to Puerto Rico, landed along the northeast coast and began a rebellion in the name of Ferdinand VII against the French colonial administrators in the city of Santo Domingo. The insurgents received aid from Spanish Puerto Rico and British Jamaica. The British blockaded the capital and occupied the port of Samaná; Sánchez defeated those loyal to France at Palo Hincado on November 7. On July 9, 1809, the British captured the city of Santo Domingo and as a consequence returned the eastern part of Hispaniola to Spanish rule.

Ironically, the Dominicans had gone to war against the French to restore Spanish rule to Santo Domingo just as the rest of Hispanic America was preparing to renounce Spanish colonialism. Moreover, the so-called War of Reconquest, following two invasions by the Haitians, had left the colony completely devastated.

Governors (1801-1809)
 1801-1802 Toussaint Louverture
 1802-1803 Antoine Nicolas Kerverseau
 1803-1808 Louis Marie Ferrand
 1808-1809 L. Dubarquier

References

Colony of Santo Domingo
Saint-Domingue
Former French colonies
Colonial government in the West Indies
Former colonies in North America
Former countries in the Caribbean
French colonization of the Americas
History of Hispaniola
History of the Dominican Republic
History of Haiti
States and territories established in 1795
States and territories disestablished in 1809
Military history of France
Military history of Spain
1790s in the Caribbean
1800s in the Caribbean
1790s in the French colonial empire
1800s in the French colonial empire
1790s in the Spanish West Indies
1800s in the Spanish West Indies
18th century in the Dominican Republic
19th century in the Dominican Republic
18th century in Haiti
19th century in Haiti
1795 in the Caribbean
1795 disestablishments in the Spanish West Indies
1795 establishments in the French colonial empire
1809 disestablishments in the French colonial empire
1809 establishments in the Spanish West Indies